The Alfréd Rényi Prize is awarded biennially by the Alfréd Rényi Institute of Mathematics of the Hungarian Academy of Science in honor of founder Alfréd Rényi. By the current rules it is given to one or two fellows of the Institute in recognition of their outstanding performance in mathematics research of the previous five-year period. Members of the Hungarian Academy of Sciences and the director are not eligible.

Laureates

See also

 List of mathematics awards
 List of prizes named after people

References

Awards of the Hungarian Academy of Sciences
Awards established in 1972

External Links 

 Official Website